The 2018 PSAC football season is the 54th season of college football of the Pennsylvania State Athletic Conference (PSAC).

2018 will be the ninth year the PSAC has partnered with ESPN approximately four to six PSAC football games will be aired on ESPN2 ESPN3, ESPNews. The league has also renewed the contract with Pennsylvania sports station PCN and the first year of an agreement between AT&T SportsNet and schools in the West Division.

Rankings

References